Roger Cañas Henao (born 27 March 1990) is a Colombian footballer who plays as a defensive midfielder who plays for Shakhter Karagandy.

Career

Tranzit
After playing for Tranzit during the first half of 2010, Cañas was close to signing for Serie A side Udinese Calcio during the summer, but following a poor World Cup for Italy, the Italian Football Federation changed the limitations on foreign players, meaning Udinese could only sign one non-eu player that season.

Jagiellonia Białystok
In August 2011, he was loaned to Jagiellonia Białystok on a one-year deal.

Shakhter Karagandy
In January 2012, Cañas signed for Kazakhstan Premier League side FC Shakhter Karagandy.

Astana
In January 2014 Cañas signed for Metalurh Donetsk, however Cañas never played for Metalurh Donetsk as he was released by the club at the beginning of February after medical test showed the presence of only one kidney. Cañas then went on to sign a two-year contract with FC Astana on 2 February 2014. On 24 August 2016, Cañas signed a new contract with the club until the end of the 2018 season.

Loan to APOEL
On 30 January 2017, Cañas moved on loan to the Cypriot side APOEL FC until the end of the 2016–17 season. He made his official debut on 11 February 2017, coming on as a 77th-minute substitute in APOEL's 1–0 away victory against Karmiotissa for the Cypriot First Division. He scored his first goal for APOEL on 20 March 2017, netting the second goal in his team's 2–0 home victory against AEL Limassol for the Cypriot First Division.

Ordabasy
On 21 July 2017, Cañas signed for Kazakhstan Premier League side Ordabasy .

Shakhtyor Soligorsk
On 17 February 2018, Shakhtyor Soligorsk announced the signing of Cañas on a one-year contract.

Irtysh Pavlodar
On 23 January 2019, Irtysh Pavlodar announced the signing of Cañas. On 3 July 2019, Cañas was released by Irtysh Pavlodar.

Career statistics

Honours

Club
Independiente Medellín
Categoría Primera A: 2009

Shakhter Karagandy
Kazakhstan Premier League: 2012
Kazakhstan Cup: 2013
Kazakhstan Super Cup: 2013

Astana
Kazakhstan Premier League: 2014, 2015, 2016
Kazakhstan Cup: 2016
Kazakhstan Super Cup: 2015

APOEL
Cypriot First Division: 2016–17

References

External links
 
 
 
 
 APOEL official profile

1990 births
Living people
Footballers from Medellín
Colombian footballers
Association football midfielders
Colombian expatriate footballers
Expatriate footballers in Latvia
Expatriate footballers in Russia
Expatriate footballers in Poland
Expatriate footballers in Kazakhstan
Expatriate footballers in Cyprus
Expatriate footballers in Belarus
Expatriate footballers in Chile
Russian Premier League players
Ekstraklasa players
Kazakhstan Premier League players
Cypriot First Division players
Primera B de Chile players
Independiente Medellín footballers
FC Tranzīts players
FC Sibir Novosibirsk players
Jagiellonia Białystok players
FC Shakhter Karagandy players
FC Astana players
APOEL FC players
FC Ordabasy players
FC Shakhtyor Soligorsk players
FC Irtysh Pavlodar players
A.C. Barnechea footballers
Colombian expatriate sportspeople in Poland
Colombian expatriate sportspeople in Belarus
Colombian expatriate sportspeople in Cyprus
Colombian expatriate sportspeople in Kazakhstan
Colombian expatriate sportspeople in Latvia
Colombian expatriate sportspeople in Russia
Colombian expatriate sportspeople in Chile